Father Michael Troy Catholic Junior High School is a school located in Wild Rose in the southeastern part of Edmonton, Alberta, Canada.
During construction of the school in 2002, there was a severe thunderstorm on July 1. During the storm, lightning struck the school, causing the ventilation system to catch fire. The damage was minimal due to heavy rain,  the school still was able to open on schedule.

See also
Edmonton Catholic School District

References
http://www.fathermichaeltroy.ecsd.net/index.htm
http://ecsd.net/

Middle schools in Edmonton
Educational institutions established in 2003
2003 establishments in Alberta